Camouflage is the thirteenth studio album and fourth English-language album by pop singer Lara Fabian. It was released on October 6, 2017. The first single from the album, "Growing Wings", was released on August 4, 2017.

Fabian embarked on the Camouflage World Tour in February 2018. The tour brought music from the album to the stage, together with her international hits for 21 dates across the world, ending in Paris in June 2018.

Background
The album has been developed and produced under the artistic direction of producer Matt Ersin in Stockholm, Los Angeles and Brussels. All the 12 songs are written and composed by Fabian together with Moh Denebi and Sharon Vaughn. It uses classical orchestration and electro-pop production to accompany Fabian's vocals. The album's title is taken from one of its songs.

Fabian's first English album was released in 1999, Lara Fabian. In 2004 she released her second English album, A Wonderful Life. Her third English album was an acoustic album with covers of some of her favourite artists, Every Woman in Me, released in 2009.

Singles
"Growing Wings" was released as the lead single on August 4, 2017, and a remix of the song by Offer Nissim was released on August 11, 2017. A video for the song was released on August 13 directed by Senol Korkmaz and produced by Matt M. Ersin and Odacity.

On September 8, 2017, "Choose What You Love Most (Let It Kill You)" was released as the second single from the album. On September 24, 2017, a music video for the song was released, directed by Senol Korkmaz and produced by Matt M. Ersin.

"We Are The Flyers" was released as a single in Germany, and elsewhere, "Chameleon" was presented as third single in February 2018 with a new version produced by Tel-Aviv based music producer Tomer G.  An additional Remix was produced for "Chameleon" by French music producer Tom York.

Track listing
All tracks written by Lara Fabian, Sharon Vaughn, and Moh Denebi. Music producer of all tracks Moh Denebi, producer: Matt M.Ersin

Charts

Weekly charts

Year-end charts

See also
Lara Fabian discography

References

2017 albums
Lara Fabian albums
Europop albums
Techno albums by Canadian artists
Techno albums by Belgian artists
Sony Music France albums
Warner Music France albums
Musicor Records albums